Palace of the Fans was a Major League baseball park located in Cincinnati, Ohio. It was the home of the Cincinnati Reds from 1902 through 1911.  The ballpark was on an asymmetrical block bounded by Findlay Street (south), Western Avenue (northeast, angling), York Street (north) and McLean Avenue (west). 

The "Findlay and Western" intersection was the home field of the Reds from 1884 through June 24, 1970, when the team moved to Riverfront Stadium.  The location of the diamond and consequently the main grandstand seating area was shifted several times during the 86½ seasons that the Reds played there.  The Palace of the Fans was actually the second of three parks that stood on the site:

1884–1901: League Park
1902–1911: Palace of the Fans
1912–1970: Redland Field, renamed Crosley Field in 1934

History

In 1900, the southwest grandstand of League Park, the home of the Reds since their days in the American Association, burned to the ground.  The Reds were forced to spend most of May and June on the road while League Park was reconfigured to move the grandstand to its old location in the southeast corner.  However, Reds owner John Brush decided to build a new grandstand for the 1901 season.

The Palace of the Fans, so audaciously named, also presented a striking appearance. Designed in a neo-classic style reminiscent of Chicago's World's Columbian Exposition of 1893, the Palace featured an extravagant facade, with 22 hand-carved Corinthian columns with elaborate details at the top, and opera-style private boxes in front of the covered grandstand. The grandstand actually sat atop carriage stalls so that the wealthy could simply drive directly to the game, an early precursor of "luxury suites".  It was built mostly of concrete, and was the second park (after Baker Bowl in Philadelphia) to use concrete for the bulk of its construction.

The grandstand was unique: a blend of Roman and Greek styling that had never been used before in a grandstand, and has never been seen since. The 3,000-seat grandstand featured 19 "fashion boxes" along the front railing that could hold 15 or more well-to-do fans. Beneath the grandstand, at field level, was standing room for 640 more spectators in a rowdy section known as "Rooter's Row." This section was so close to the players, the fans could take part in on-field conversations. Rooters Row was also strategically placed by the bar. The facade behind home plate contained the word "CINCINNATI". This was obviously of no benefit to anyone in attendance, assuming they knew where they were, but it ensured that pictures of the stands would inform viewers. However, the designers of the park forgot to include dugouts or clubhouses for the players.

The original 1884 stand remained as right field seating, having escaped the fire. A less elaborate stand connected the old and the new structures. Both the contemporary club owners and modern baseball historians consider the 1902 structure to be a new ballpark. Cincinnati fans not interested in the hype continued to call the facility "League Park", hence the alternate historical name, "League Park III".

On Opening Day, April 17, 1902, some 10,000 spectators crowded into the park and watched the Reds lose to the Chicago Colts (a.k.a. "Cubs"), 6-1.

The Reds had little on-field success during their stay at the Palace, but one event foreshadowed an historic development on this site: night baseball. On June 19, 1909, an exhibition game was held at the Palace under temporary lighting developed by George F. Cahill. This was not the first time night baseball had been attempted, but this experiment was deemed a success. In addition a soccer game between a Cincinnati team and a British touring team and a football game between the Gyms and Christ Church were held on October 14, 1909. Nothing would come of it, though, until the 1930s when night ball came to be seen as a necessity for boosting attendance.

When it opened, the Palace had been described as "the handsomest grounds in the country".[Cincinnati Enquirer, March 28, 1902, p.3] However, as with the original Columbian Exposition buildings, the Palace soon lost its lustre. For one thing, the seating area was too small. Then, over time, the structure fell into a state of disrepair; city inspectors began to note cracked girders, decayed supports and unsafe floors.

The last game played at the Palace was on October 12, 1911, against the Cubs, the same team they played when the park was opened. Unfortunately, a fire damaged the 1901 grandstand significantly later that day. (Benson, p. 101) The Palace was done after 10 seasons. Although the original 1884 grandstand (aka the right field seating) had survived the fire due to the less elaborate stand serving as a wall between the two seating areas, the Reds (unlike 10 years ago) had no intention of reusing the 27-year old grandstand as the main grandstand again. The charred remains of the Palace of the Fans, as well as the remaining seating from the original League Park were demolished to make room for "a modern and sumptuous stand, the equal of anything in the country."[Cincinnati Enquirer, October 12, 1911, p.8] 

By opening day of 1912, the Reds had an entirely new ballpark waiting for them on the site: Redland Field, which would later become known as Crosley Field.

References

Sources 
Cincinnati's Crosley Field: The Illustrated History of a Classic Ballpark by Greg Rhodes and John Erardi, 1995, Road West Publishing
Baseball Library.com
Green Cathedrals, by Phil Lowry, 1992
Baseball Parks of North America, by Michael Benson, 1989
The Cincinnati Reds, by Lee Allen, Putnam, 1948.

External links
Sanborn map, 1904

Sports venues in Cincinnati
Cincinnati Reds stadiums
Defunct Major League Baseball venues
Demolished buildings and structures in Ohio
1902 establishments in Ohio
Sports venues demolished in 1911
Demolished sports venues in Ohio
Baseball venues in Ohio
Baseball in Cincinnati
1911 disestablishments in Ohio
Sports venues completed in 1902